Bezujno is a village in the municipality of Čajniče, in the Republika Srpska entity of Bosnia and Herzegovina. It is located near the border with Montenegro.

History
Bezujno was once a municipality (opština) during Yugoslavia.

According to the 1991 census, the village had a total of 138 inhabitants, out of whom 107 were Serbs, 30 Muslims, and 1 Croat.

The former settlement of Medoševići was annexed into Bezujno by 1995.

References

Populated places in Čajniče